Sporting Goods is a lost 1928 American comedy silent film directed by Malcolm St. Clair, written by George Marion Jr., Ray Harris and Thomas J. Crizer, and starring Richard Dix, Ford Sterling, Gertrude Olmstead, Philip Strange, Myrtle Stedman, Wade Boteler and Claude King. It was released on February 11, 1928, by Paramount Pictures.

Cast 
Richard Dix as Richard Shelby
Ford Sterling as Mr. Jordan
Gertrude Olmstead as Alice Elliott
Philip Strange as Henry Thorpe
Myrtle Stedman as Mrs. Elliott
Wade Boteler as Regan
Claude King as Timothy Stanfield
Maude Turner Gordon as Mrs. Stanfield

References

External links 
 

1928 films
1920s English-language films
Silent American comedy films
1928 comedy films
Paramount Pictures films
Films directed by Malcolm St. Clair
American black-and-white films
American silent feature films
Lost American films
1928 lost films
Lost comedy films
1920s American films